Jangaon district is a district in the Indian state of Telangana. It was a part of the erstwhile Warangal district prior to the re-organisation of districts in the state. The district shares boundaries with Suryapet, Yadadri, Warangal, Hanamkonda, Siddipet and Mahabubabad districts.

Geography 

History 
Jangaon District was formed on 11 October 2016, Jangaon is made as the district headquarters along with 31 newly formed district in Telangana. Warangal district was divided into five districts: Warangal Rural district (now Hanamkonda district), Warangal Rural district (now Warangal district), Jangaon district, Jayashankar district and Mahabubabad district. The Jangaon district was formed with mostly old Jangaon Revenue division except Maddur, Cherial and Newly formed Komuravelli Mandals which were transferred to newly formed Siddipet district, Ghanpur and Zaffergadh from Warangal Revenue division and Gundala of Nalgonda district were merged with Jangaon district. Gundala was later transferred to Yadadri Bhuvanagiri district. One of the most acclaimed Telugu poets of all time Bammera Pothana was born in the village of Bammera in Jangoan in 1450 AD.

Demographics 

 Census of India, the district has a population of 566,376. According to the 2011 census, 85.08% of the population speaks Telugu, 10.56% Lambadi and 2.65% Urdu as their first language.

Climate 
Jangaon experiences a tropical kind of climate. It's a drought prone area according to Geological survey. Experiences very hot summers, moderate winters and rains less than the average precipitation.

The temperatures are highest on average in May, at around 33.9 °C. In December, the average temperature is 22.0 °C. It is the lowest average temperature of the whole year.
The variation in the precipitation between the driest and wettest months is 182 mm. The average temperatures vary during the year by 11.9 °C.

Administrative divisions 

The district has two revenue divisions of Jangaon and Ghanpur (Station) are sub-divided into 12 mandals. Sri Ch.Shivalingaiah, IAS is the present collector of the district.

Mandals 
The below table categorises 12 mandals into their respective revenue divisions in the district:

Notable personalities 

 Bammera Pothana
Palkuriki Somanatha

See also 
 List of districts in Telangana

References

External links 
 Official website

 
Districts of Telangana